The following is a list of episodes for first-run syndicated action/crime drama Kung Fu: The Legend Continues. The series premiered on January 27, 1993, and ended on January 1, 1997. A total of 88 episodes were produced spanning 4 seasons.

Series overview

Episodes

Season 1 (1993)

Season 2 (1994)

Season 3 (1995)

Season 4 (1996–97)

References

 

Legend Continues
Lists of American action television series episodes
Lists of American crime television series episodes
Lists of Canadian television series episodes